The Truce of Shamkor was a truce agreed to by King George VII of Georgia and Timur, ruler of Timurid Empire on September 1401, which lasted for few months. In late 1401, Timur invaded the Kingdom of Georgia once again. George VII had to sue for peace, and sent his brother, Constantine with the contributions. Timur was preparing for a major confrontation with the Ottoman dynasty and apparently wished to freeze the currently prevailing situation in Georgia, until he could return to deal with it more decisively and thoroughly at his leisure.

Thus, he made peace with George on several terms:

Georgia would
 pay annual tribute;
 provide troops for Timur;
 allow Timur's armies transit;
 special privileges for Muslims;
 not practise Christianity on Muslim territory.

Timur gave the Georgian ambassadors fine gowns and a good send-off, pleased that ‘the obstinate have put their heads into the yoke of submission’. Timur nonetheless undertook some preventive measures and broke the treaty: attacked the Georgian garrison of Tortumi, demolishing the citadel and looting the surrounding area.

References 

Ceasefires
1410s treaties
Military history of the Timurid Empire
Treaties of the Kingdom of Georgia
15th century in the Kingdom of Georgia
Georgia